Saxparty 4 is a 1977 Ingmar Nordströms studio album. In 1991, it was re-released on CD.

Track listing
Chanson D'Amour
Bye, Bye, Bye Little Butterfly
Sailing
Härliga Sommarö
Red Sails in the Sunset
Du är den som allting handlar om
Humlans Flykt (The Flight of the Bumble-Bee)
Han är min sång och min glädje (There Goes My Everything)
Rara Underbara Katarina
Verde
Strangers in the Night
Du har gett mig toner till en sång
Öresund
Love is a Many Splendoured Thing

Charts

References 

1977 albums
Ingmar Nordströms albums